HMCS Miramichi (hull number MCB 163) was a  that was constructed for the Royal Canadian Navy during the Cold War. Entering service in 1957, the vessel was used as a training ship on the West Coast of Canada for the majority of her career. Miramichi was decommissioned in 1998 and the vessel's fate is unknown.

Design and description
The Bay class were designed and ordered as replacements for the Second World War-era minesweepers that the Royal Canadian Navy operated at the time.

They had a complement of 38 officers and ratings.

The Bay-class minesweepers were powered by two GM 12-cylinder diesel engines driving two shafts creating . The ships were armed with one 40 mm Bofors gun and were equipped with minesweeping gear.

Operational history
Ordered as a replacement for sister ship,  which had been transferred to the French Navy in 1954, the ship's keel was laid down on 2 February 1956 by Victoria Machinery Depot at their yard in Victoria, British Columbia. Named for a bay located in New Brunswick, Miramichi was launched on 22 February 1957. The ship was commissioned on 29 October 1957.

After commissioning, the minesweeper joined Training Group Pacific on the West Coast of Canada. In 1972, the class was redesignated patrol escorts. The vessel remained a part of the unit until being paid off on 16 December 1998. Colledge claims the vessel was paid off in October 1998.

References

Notes

Citations

References
 
 
 
 
 

 

Bay-class minesweepers
Ships built in British Columbia
1957 ships
Cold War minesweepers of Canada
Minesweepers of the Royal Canadian Navy